Warthausen is a municipality in the district of Biberach in Baden-Württemberg in Germany and birthplace of Friedrich Karl von Koenig-Warthausen. Included among its neighbourhoods is Oberhöfen, which hosts the Dorfplatz Feschd every year.

Geographical location
Through the municipality flows the southern Danube tributary Riß.

Municipality arrangement
The municipality Warthausen consists of the main municipality Warthausen with Oberhöfen and Röhrwangen and from the part locations Birkenhard and courtyards with Barabein, Galmutshöfen, Herrlishöfen, Rappenhof and Rißhöfen.

Incorporations
On 1 January 1973 Birkenhard was incorporated to Warthausen.
	
The incorporation of Höfen was on 1 May 1974.

Mayor
Succeeding Franz Wohnhaas who was since 1987 in office and no longer contested the election, Cai-Ullrich Fark became 2003 elected mayor of Warthausen. On October 17, 2010, he was replaced by Wolfgang Jautz (independent). With 53.73 percent of the vote to Jautz prevailed over the incumbent, who only came to 46.02 percent of the vote. The turnout was 62.9 percent.

Council
The number of councilors may change by overhang mandates. The local elections on 25 May 2014 led to the following official results. The turnout was 52.8% (2009: 57.4%). The council consists of the elected honorary councilors and the mayor as chairman. The mayor is entitled to vote in the municipal council.
party	be right	seats	2009 results
Free Voters Association	62.3%	10	63.9%, 10 seats
CDU	37.7%	6	36.1%, 5 seats

Twin cities
Warthausen is twinned with:
 Waldenburg, Saxony

Economy and Infrastructure

Transport
Warthausen is located on the Southern Railway (Württemberg)Ulm - Friedrichshafen. In hour clock trains run to Ulm and Friedrichshafen. Former station now serves as Button museum. Until Ulm and up to Bad Schussenried the tariff of Donau-Iller-Nahverkehrsverbund is valid.
Following the motorway network via the motorway interchange Neu-Ulm is on the four-lane federal Bundesstraße 30.

Things

In Warthausen starts Öchsle bike trail to Ochsenhausen, the track is sometimes parallel to the route of the Öchsle railway.

Museums
The Button Museum in the former station building was opened in spring 1999.
The "Oechsle", a narrow-gauge museum railway, runs from May to October during the weekends.

Buildings
The Schloss Warthausen (16th century) had been in the possession of the counts of Stadion (state) since 1696. It was acquired in 1829 by Wilhelm von König-Warthausen. Since 1985 the palace and estate are owned by Franz Freiherr von Ulm zu Erbach.

The Warthausen brewery (founded 1632, closed 1970) was known as beer supplier for up to 400 restaurants in South Germany. Today a nursing home is housed in the brewery building.

Sons and daughters of the town
Franz Kober (1821–1897), professor of Catholic theology at the University of Tübingen
Richard Freiherr Koenig and from Warthausen (1830–1911), naturalist
Friedrich Karl Freiherr Koenig and from Warthausen (1906–1986), born at Schloss Warthausen, pilot, lawyer and author 
Karl Arnold (1901–1958), born in Herrlishöfen, politician (Centre Party, CDU), MP, MdL (Nordrhein-Westfalen), Prime Minister of North Rhine-Westphalia (1947–1956)

Rüdiger Vogler (born 1942), actor
Karl Imhof, pastor and honorary citizen of Warthausen and Bedernau (Mindelheim)

Persons who are in conjunction with the municipality
CDU MP Julius Steiner (de) (1924–1997), lived in Warthausen until the 1990s.

References 

Biberach (district)
Württemberg